Kaarlo Harvala (1885–1942) was a Finnish journalist and politician who was among the chairmen of the Social Democratic Party. He held the post between 1930 and 1942. He was also a member of the Finnish Parliament.

Biography
Harvala was born in Ruovesi on 5 September 1885. He was the secretary of the Union of Finnish Landlords in Tampere between 1912 and 1918. He was arrested in 1918 due to his political views. Following his release from the prison he worked as an editor-in-chief of Kansan Sana newspaper and Kansan magazine in Tampere. Then he became the editor of Sosialist newspaper in Turku in 1919 and remained in the post until 1923.

He became a member of the Parliament on 5 September 1922 and served there until 31 August 1939. In 1930 he was elected as the leader of Social Democratic Party, replacing Matti Paasivuori in the post. Harvala remained in the post until his death in Helsinki on 31 August 1942.

References

External links

20th-century Finnish journalists
1885 births
1942 deaths
Finnish trade union leaders
Leaders of the Social Democratic Party of Finland
Members of the Parliament of Finland (1922–24)
Members of the Parliament of Finland (1924–27)
Members of the Parliament of Finland (1927–29)
Members of the Parliament of Finland (1929–30)
Members of the Parliament of Finland (1930–33)
Members of the Parliament of Finland (1933–36)
Members of the Parliament of Finland (1936–39)
People from Ruovesi
Finnish prisoners and detainees